Raklitza is a river of Saxony, Germany. It is a right tributary of the Weißer Schöps, which it joins near Rietschen.

See also
List of rivers of Saxony

Rivers of Saxony
Rivers of Germany